Arkhangelsky is a Russian surname. Notable people with the surname include:

Aleksei Arkhangelsky (1986-), Russian football player
Alexander Arhangelskii (1938–), Russian mathematician
Alexander Arkhangelsky (aircraft designer) (1892–1978), Russian Soviet aircraft designer
Alexander Arkhangelsky (composer) (1846–1924), Russian composer
Andrey Arkhangelsky (1879–1940), Russian Soviet geologist
Vitaly Arkhangelsky (1975–), Russian shipping and insurance magnate

Russian-language surnames